The Centre to End All Sexual Exploitation is a non-profit organization in Edmonton, Alberta, Canada.

History 
The Centre to End All Sexual Exploitation (CEASE) was formerly named the Prostitution Awareness and Action Foundation of Edmonton (PAAFE). In April 2011, CEASE replaced PAAFE. Kate Quinn has been executive director of CEASE since 2011.

In the early 1990s, the City of Edmonton formed an organization named Communities for Controlled Prostitution, which was later renamed Communities for Changing Prostitution. Because of widespread prostitution in the Edmonton neighborhoods of Boyle Street and McCauley, the city of Edmonton police chief declared 1992 "the year of the john." Mayor Jan Reimer and Police Chief Doug McNally subsequently launched the Action Group on Prostitution and the Mayor's Safer Cities Advisory Committee expanded to include Communities for Changing Prostitution. At this time, several Edmonton streets were converted to one-way travel in an attempt to restrict circling vehicles.

Programs 
In 1996, the city of Edmonton launched its Prostitution Offender Program (“john school”) which is now called STOP: Sex Trade Offender Program. CEASE continues to coordinate the Sex Trade Offender Program and manage the funds generated by the program.

Events 
Each year the Centre to End All Sexual Exploitation hosts the Men of Honour ceremony, which recognizes men in society who show exemplary leadership to end gender discrimination and violence, for example Mark Huyser-Wierenga and Amarjeet Sohi received the award in 2014 and 2015 respectively.

See also 
 Feminist views on prostitution
 Prostitution in Canada

References

External links 
 
 Organization profile on CanadaHelps

Charities based in Canada
Organizations that combat human trafficking
Prostitution in Canada
Sex worker organizations in Canada